Khaqan Haider Ghazi (Urdu: خاقان حیدر غازی) (born December 28, 1965) is a Punjabi poet and working in FM95 Pakistan, Punjab Rung program Nena De Akhay Lagay.

Background
Mr. Khaqan Haider Ghazi, Deputy Director Admin of Punjab Institute Of Language Art & Culture. Holds a master's degree in Arabic and Urdu Literature and is also a graduate of Law. Mr. Khaqan Haider Ghazi is a literary figure and has written books on poetry, mainly in Punjabi Language. He has also written script of various dramas and Punjabi songs. Mr. Khaqan has been associated with FM 103 & FM 95 Punjab Rung and hosting an on-air program "Naina De Aakhay Lage".
Now Khaqan is working as Editor "Trinjan", a Punjabi magazine published by PILAC, Lahore. Khaqan wrote one Punjabi movie "Basnati", also wrote lyrics of many Urdu & Punjabi songs. Also wrote and directed a Punjabi Mystic Poetic & Musical Stage play "Kahy Shah Hussain".

Books

 Band Gali Wich Shaam - Punjabi Poetry (1986)
 Same Ka Giyan - Punjabi Poetry (2000)
 Dum Dum Naal Dhamaal - Punjabi Poetry (2006)
 Madhu Naal Salah - Punjabi Poetry (2008)
 Sawan Lae Udeek - Lok Kahani (2010)
 Kahay Hussain - Play (2011)
 Germany Yaatra - Story (2011)
 Mei Chaiter Ni Chakhya - Punjabi Poetry (2013)
 E-Commerce - Educational Book

References

1965 births
Living people
Punjabi-language poets